Iraklis Anastasakis (born 22 December 1971) is a retired Greek football striker.

References

1971 births
Living people
Greek footballers
Panachaiki F.C. players
Ethnikos Piraeus F.C. players
Association football forwards
Super League Greece players